Sugarcamp Run is a  long 3rd order tributary to Buffalo Creek in Brooke County, West Virginia.

Variant names
According to the Geographic Names Information System, it has also been known historically as:
Sugar Camp Run
Sugar Run

Course
Sugarcamp Run rises about 1 mile east of Independence, Pennsylvania, in Washington County and then flows southwesterly into Brooke County to join Buffalo Creek about 2 miles southeast of Bethany, West Virginia.

Watershed
Sugarcamp Run drains  of area, receives about 40.1 in/year of precipitation, has a wetness index of 329.61, and is about 44% forested.

See also
List of rivers of West Virginia

References

Rivers of Pennsylvania
Rivers of West Virginia
Rivers of Brooke County, West Virginia
Rivers of Washington County, Pennsylvania